Matthew Eagles (born 9 February 1990) is a former professional Australian rules footballer who last played for the Brisbane Lions in the Australian Football League (AFL).

Eagles is originally from South Australia and grew up supporting Port Adelaide. He eventually found his way to Queensland where he played for the Yeronga Football Club in the QAFL. Outside of playing football he owned a landscaping business. In 2016, Eagles appeared in season two of the reality TV series The Recruit, where he was the eventual winner.

In the NEAFL Grand Final, he amassed 18 disposals, including a league high 17 intercept possessions.

Eagles made his senior AFL debut in round 7 of the 2018 season, against Collingwood. Being 28 at the time, he was the oldest debutant in the club's history.

At the conclusion of the 2020 AFL season he was delisted by Brisbane.

References

External links

Living people
Australian rules footballers from South Australia
North Ballarat Football Club players
1990 births
Brisbane Lions players
Aspley Football Club players
Participants in Australian reality television series